Meridemis bathymorpha is a species of moth of the  family Tortricidae. It is found in Vietnam, Thailand, Indonesia (Sumatra, Java, Bali, Sulawesi), western Malaysia, Taiwan and Nepal.

The wingspan is 13–15 mm. The forewings are dull pale ochreous, the lower half clouded with tawny. There is a blackish costal spot with a greyish-blue center in males. The hindwings are light grey, becoming pale pinkish ochreous towards the apex.

References

Moths described in 1976
Archipini